Eastridge is a neighborhood located within the Mitchells Plain urban area of the City of Cape Town in the Western Cape province of South Africa.

References

Suburbs of Cape Town